Stenoporpia glaucomarginaria is a species of geometrid moth in the family Geometridae. It was described by James Halliday McDunnough in 1945 and is found in North America.

The MONA or Hodges number for Stenoporpia glaucomarginaria is 6472.

References

 Scoble, Malcolm J., ed. (1999). Geometrid Moths of the World: A Catalogue (Lepidoptera, Geometridae), 1016.

Further reading

 Butterflies and Moths of North America
 

Geometridae